Christian Braunmann Tullin (6 September 1728 – 21 January 1765) was a Norwegian businessman and poet. He was regarded as one of Denmark-Norway's most important poetic talents by his contemporaries.

Biography
Tullin was born in Christiania (now Oslo), Norway. His parents were Gulbrand Hansen Tullins (1694-1742) and Ragnhild Hansdatter Dehli (1695-1765). His father, who originated in the rural district of Ringebu, had become a wealthy merchant. Tullin attended Christiania Cathedral School and later graduated from the University of Copenhagen with a theology diploma in 1748.

After his father's death, his mother married  Claus Therkelsen Koefoed, who was a customs official. Together with his step-father, in 1750 Tullin  started Faabro Pudder- og Stivelsesfabrik, a company which produced powder, starch and nails. It was located at Granfossen on Lysakerelva. He also built a summer residence at the factories, directly above the nail factory.  This building was later taken over by O. Mustad & Søn. 

In 1759, Tullin became the customs inspector of Christiania. In 1760, he became a custodian in the city.  He became city manager for Christiania from 1763. He was also Chairman of the Board of Customs and Excise Service (Oslo regiontollsted) and in 1764 the Customs Director.

Personal life
In 1760, he married Mette Feddersen Kruckow (1725-1809). She was a niece of Nicolai Feddersen (1699-1769), who was magistrate president of Christiania, and his wife Ditlevine Feddersen.

Works
Samtlige Skrifter was issued in Copenhagen between 1770–1773 in three volumes. The first volume contained his poetry, while the two others contained essays.
These works have been re-published over time including in a four volume set published between 1972-1976 by  Gyldendal Norsk Forlag.

References

1728 births
1765 deaths
18th-century Norwegian poets
Norwegian male poets
Writers from Oslo
18th-century Norwegian businesspeople
People educated at Oslo Cathedral School
University of Copenhagen alumni
18th-century male writers